SS John S. Mosby was a Liberty ship built in the United States during World War II. She was named after John S. Mosby, a Confederate army cavalry battalion commander in the American Civil War. After the war, Mosby worked as an attorney, supporting his former enemy's commander, U.S. President Ulysses S. Grant. He also served as the American consul to Hong Kong and in the US Department of Justice.

Construction
John S. Mosby was laid down on 22 July 1943, under a Maritime Commission (MARCOM) contract, MC hull 1207, by the St. Johns River Shipbuilding Company, Jacksonville, Florida; she was launched on 3 October 1943.

History
She was allocated to Isthmian Steamship Co., on 16 October 1943. On 7 June 1948, she was laid up in the National Defense Reserve Fleet, Wilmington, North Carolina. She was laid up in the, Hudson River Reserve Fleet, Jones Point, New York, 3 October 1957. She was sold for scrapping, on 23 December 1970, to Dawood Corp., Ltd. She was removed from the fleet on 1 July 1971.

References

Bibliography

 
 
 
 

 

Liberty ships
Ships built in Jacksonville, Florida
1943 ships
Wilmington Reserve Fleet
Hudson River Reserve Fleet